Security Police – the Legal Entity of Public Law of the Ministry of Internal Affairs of Georgia, which operates throughout Georgia and protects the assets of legal entities and physical persons and their personal protection from illegal and criminal activities. The Security Police is the service equipped with constantly updated technology. The main mission of the Security Police is to secure the citizens' safety and create a healthy environment for their work.

In 2008, the Security Police introduced the protection radio system based on the new MESH technology. In the whole territory of Georgia, with the purpose of protecting facilities, the Security Police uses new generation of American peripheral equipment and the transmitters produced by the American company AES Intellinet. This system is exclusively used by the Security Police on the territory of Georgia and ensures dispersionless reception of the signals delivered from the facilities and their fast processing. Police protection measures are carried out by the Security Police during the day, in working hours as well as in 24-hour mode. The Security Police carries out guarding, escorting, encashment of bank funds, precious metals and valuables.

Service
 Technical means of protection
 Police protection
 Guarding and escorting
 Body guard service 
 Encashment service
 GPS/GPRS protection

Contact details
 Info service: 125
 Legal address: 11th km Davit Aghmashenebeli alley, 0131 Tbilisi, Georgia
 Public Relations and Marking Division: (+995) 32 241 94 64; (+995) 32 241 95 97

References 

Law enforcement agencies of Georgia (country)